Bilby's Doll is an opera in three acts composed by Carlisle Floyd. The libretto is based on the 1928 American novel A Mirror for Witches by Esther Forbes.

Bilby's Doll was Floyd's eighth opera. It had its premiere on February 27, 1976, at the Houston Grand Opera in a production by David Pountney with sets by Ming Cho Lee. The original cast, conducted by Christopher Keene, included Catherine Malfitano, Joy Davidson, Thomas Paul, and Jack Trussel. Houston Grand's general director David Glockley commissioned the work in honor of the US Bicentennial.

Synopsis
Bilby's Doll is the story of Doll Bilby, a French orphan whose spirituality and imagination collide with the hostility and practical ideals of the Puritan colony where she is raised by her foster parents.

Doll was brought to Massachusetts from France by Jared Bilby, her foster father. She declines a marriage proposal from Titus Thumb, a young ministerial student, saying that her natural parents were burned as witches in France and she worries that she might also become a witch. Instead, she meets and marries a man who pretends he is a demon, but who is later revealed to be the estranged and opportunistic son of the minister Zelley, Doll's friend and supporter.

Although she is at first devastated by the revelation of her lover as a mortal, Doll's belief that her husband is a demon is restored as she dies giving birth in a jail cell.

Roles

References

External links 
Carlisle Floyd, Boosey & Hawkes

Operas
Operas by Carlisle Floyd
1976 operas
English-language operas
Operas set in the United States
Operas based on novels
Opera world premieres at Houston Grand Opera